Svetlana Kuznetsova and Martina Navratilova were the defending champions, but Navratilova did not compete this year.

Kuznetsova teamed up with Elena Likhovtseva and lost in the final to Janette Husárová and Conchita Martínez. The score was 6–0, 1–6, 6–3.

Seeds

Draw

Draw

References
 Official results archive (ITF)
 Official results archive (WTA)

2004 Dubai Tennis Championships
Doubles